Serxho Ujka (born 27 August 1998), known as Serxho Ujka, is an Albanian footballer who plays as a midfielder for Laçi in the Kategoria Superiore.

References

External links

1998 births
Living people
KF Shënkolli players
KF Bylis Ballsh players
Kategoria e Parë players
Kategoria Superiore players
Albanian footballers
Association football midfielders